Idriss Jamil Aberkane (born May 23, 1986) is a French lecturer and essayist. Known for his writings and lectures on personal development, he published a particularly successful essay in 2016, titled Free up your mind!. However, he was the subject of criticism as he was accused of artificially inflating his resume and of using his three doctoral diplomas (Ph.Ds) to talk about sciences that are not in his areas of expertise. The scientific accuracy of some of his statements and publications was questioned by other researchers. His support for Didier Raoult, the famous French epidemiologist, and his questioning of the reliability of Covid-19 vaccines, in particular Pfizer's, has caused him to be classified as an antivax, or a conspiracist.

Early life and education 
His parents taught mathematics at a teachers' college, and as a boy he participated in the Muslim Scouts of France, of which his father was one of the first leaders; he has cited his participation in the scouts as an inspiration for his life's work.

Aberkane has obtained three doctorate degrees in management science from Paris Saclay, in comparative literature from University of Strasbourg, and in diplomacy from Centre d'Études Diplomatiques et Stratégiques.  He became known in France for his lectures and essays about neurosciences, social psychology, gamification and their applications in education and business.  A profile in the French newspaper Le Monde described his advocacy for these applications as "a bit North American, where science, popularization, morality, personal narrative and advice intertwine".

Criticisms 
He has been criticized for his lack of rigor and fabricating some parts of his resume,. Aberkane has since then published a copy of all his diplomas (including his three doctoral diplomas) on his personal website.

For social psychology and neurosciences researcher Sebastian Dieguez, Free up your Mind is "an uninterrupted succession of isolated facts, of pointless detours, anecdotes and personal opinions, elementary mistakes, debunked "theories", truisms, hyperboles and aphorisms, which do not make for good science education."

Aberkane claims to have solved the Collatz conjecture, but mathematicians who have studied his publications strongly disagree and point out to major mistakes in the published works. Discussing Aberkane's works, Fabien Durand, a professor of Mathematics at Université de Picardie Jules-Verne, and the president of the french Mathematical Society, considers that he made several mistakes and that "most of the proofs are at the level of a high-school or first-year college student".

Works 
 
 
 

On the legitimacy of Aberkane's resume, Sebastian Dieguez adds: "Three theses! Now that is something that should impress people… Except, of course, anyone who has any knowledge of the academic world. As such, if a researcher or laboratory director noticed three theses listed on the curriculum vitae of an applicant, they would in most cases dismiss it on the spot, all the more so when the applicant has not produced any scientific publication. "Having" three Ph.Ds is in no way a proof of qualification—if anything it strongly hints towards an academic tourist without goals, discipline, nor any kind of dedication. Furthermore, a scholar employer—noticing that all three theses were defended in less than three years when a single thesis takes around four years of dedicated work in a laboratory to complete—would have to wonder if the Ph.Ds were anything more than honorary diplomas.

References

External links

1986 births
Living people
21st-century French non-fiction writers
Science communicators